Tennis is a racquet sport played on a ground court.

Tennis may also refer to:

Sports
Real tennis, a precursor to modern (lawn) tennis
Soft tennis, a type of tennis using a soft ball
Table tennis, also known as ping-pong

Places
Tennis, Egypt, a medieval city
Tennis, Kansas, United States, an unincorporated community

Games
Tennis (1981 video game), an Activision game
Tennis (1984 video game), a Nintendo game
Tennis (paper game)

Music
Tennis (album), by Chris Rea
Tennis (band), a husband/wife group consisting of Patrick Riley and Alaina Moore

Other uses
Cary Tennis, American author and advice columnist for Salon.com
Tennis (magazine)

See also

Tennys Sandgren (born 1991), American tennis player
Tonnis